Popa spurca, also known as the African twig mantis, is a species of mantis native to Africa.

See also
List of mantis genera and species
African mantis
Stick mantis

References

Mantidae
Mantodea of Africa
Insects described in 1856